Burning Star may refer to:
 Burning Star (album), an album by Helstar 
 "Burning Star" (song), a song by Belgian singer Natalia and American singer Anastacia
 Sampoornesh Babu a Tamil film actor known as Burning Star Sampoornesh Babu

See also
 Jack Starr's Burning Starr, an American heavy metal band